The Fine Arts Building is a building on the Seattle University campus, in the U.S. state of Washington. The building houses the Vachon Gallery.

See also
 Seattle University College of Arts and Sciences

References

External links

 

Buildings and structures in Seattle
Seattle University campus